Ranipur, Bangladesh is a village in Barguna District in the Barisal Division of southern-central Bangladesh.

See also
 List of villages in Bangladesh

References

External links
 Satellite map at Maplandia.com

Villages in Barguna District
Populated places in Barguna District
Villages in Barisal Division